Come to Me is the third studio album by Juice Newton & Silver Spur released on the Capitol Records label in 1977. This was Newton's third and final album with Silver Spur, and she released her solo debut the following year. Some foreign issues of the album included "It's a Heartache", which was released as a one-off single in the United States in 1978.

The album was released on CD for the first time on May 7, 2012, by BGO Records.

Track listing

Personnel
Juice Newton - lead vocals, rhythm guitar
Otha Young - lead guitar, backing vocals
Tom Kealey - bass, backing vocals
Robbie Gillman - keyboards, backing vocals
Denny Seiwell (tracks: A2, B1, B2), Teddy Irwin - drums
Brian Rogers - "strings and things" arrangements
Elliot F. Mazer, Juice Newton, Silver Spur - arrangements

External links

1977 albums
Juice Newton albums
Albums produced by Elliot Mazer
Capitol Records albums